Laia Costa Bertrán (born 18 February 1985) is a Spanish actress who has worked in Spain, Russia, Germany, Argentina, Italy, United Kingdom and the United States.

Early life and education
Costa was born in Barcelona, Spain, to José María Costa, a manager of the Niza dance hall, and Cristina Bertrán, one of Barcelona's first female taxi drivers. She grew up in Horta. The eldest daughter of a family of two girls, her younger sister is Noemí Costa, also an actress and architect but currently dedicated to art direction.

Costa considers her foray into acting as an accident since she never considered becoming an actress when she was growing up in Spain, she affirms that she had no referents and when she had to decide which profession to study, acting was not valued as a possibility. She played basketball from a young age for 17 years, playing for the Hispano Francés sports club at the point guard position. Regarding her experience in sports, Costa recalls "it has given me many values that I have not found elsewhere, at least not in such a pure form. Teamwork, to begin with."

She obtained a degree in advertising, public relations, and marketing at the Blanquerna-Ramon Llull University's School of Communication and International Relations. After graduating, Costa worked for marketing agencies as an account executive at Mr. John Sample without set hours and later for a German company with strict ins and outs. Because of this, she had more free time and decided to take theatre classes with her sister at the Nancy Tuñón School in Barcelona. 

Costa took different acting courses and eventually took casting director Luci Lenox's Acting in English course at the Frank Stien Studio for two years. She speaks fluent Catalan, Spanish, French, and English.

Career
She starred in the critically acclaimed 2015 film Victoria, which was almost entirely improvised by the actors; the 134-minute film was shot in a single take. Costa won the Lola for Best Actress and was nominated for a European Film Awards for Best European Actress. Her performance also garnered her a nomination for the prestigious BAFTA EE Rising Star Award. Prior to her big international breakthrough, she starred in Cites, the Catalan remake of the British TV series Dates, and Polseres Vermelles, winner of the International Emmy Award for Best Kids TV Series, adapted by Steven Spielberg for North America as Red Band Society.

Costa starred alongside Nicholas Hoult in Drake Doremus' Newness (Sundance Film Festival 2017). In addition to co-starring with Mia Wasikowska and Christopher Abbott in Nicolas Pesce's Piercing (Sundance Film Festival 2018), she is the lead of two films which premiered at the Tribeca Film Festival 2018, Miguel Arteta's Duck Butter with Alia Shawkat and Maine with Thomas Mann. Also in 2018, Costa co-starred in Amazon/Dan Fogelman's drama film Life Itself with Oscar Isaac and Antonio Banderas.

Costa starred alongside Josh O'Connor in Harry Wootliff's critically acclaimed directorial debut Only You, which premiered in competition at the BFI London Film Festival, on 19 October 2018.

The New York Times includes her in 2015’s "Breakthrough Performances of the Fall Season".

In April 2019, it was announced that Costa had been cast alongside Guillermo Pfening in Isabel Coixet's Foodie Love series for HBO Europe. She then filmed the international co-produced Italian English language television series released in 2020 Devils co-starring along Patrick Dempsey based on the international bestseller novel of the same name by Guido Maria Brera. That same year, Costa starred alongside an ensemble cast in the American science fiction television anthology series Soulmates, in the third episode of the first season titled "Little Adventures", directed by Marco Kreuzpaintner and written by Jessica Knappett and Brett Goldstein & William Bridges.

Costa returned to the Berlinale to premiere Lullaby by Alauda Ruiz de Azúa, which premiered in the Panorama section on 11 February 2022. Subsequently, the film premiered at the Malaga Film Festival on 20 March 2022, where it was the grand winner of the edition with the Golden Biznaga for Best Spanish Film, the Silver Biznaga for Best Screenplay, and the Silver Biznaga for Best Female Performance for Costa and Susi Sánchez. For her performance as Amaia, a new mother, Costa won accolades including the Goya Award for Best Actress, the Feroz Award for Best Main Actress in a Film, the Forqué Award for Best Film Actress and received a CEC Awards nomination for Best Actress.

Costa was also part of an ensemble cast in Alibi's British political thriller series The Diplomat, which premiered on 28 February 2023. She then starred in the Spanish film The Enchanted by Elena Trapé, which premiered as part of the official section of the 26th Málaga Film Festival on March 12, 2023 and will be released in theaters in Spain on June 2, 2023. Costa is set to play the titular character in two upcoming Spanish films El maestro que prometió el mar by Patricia Font and the film adaptation of Sara Mesa's novel, Un amor by Isabel Coixet. She will also star in the revival of the Catalan romantic drama TV series titled Cites: Barcelona, and a yet-to-be-revealed American epic fantasy series.

Personal life
Prior to her return to Barcelona, Costa lived for several years in Brickell, the financial district of Miami, Florida, with her husband David López, CEO of a multinational retail company, whom she met during her university years. In May 2020, she gave birth to her first child at home.

Filmography

Film

Television

Theatre 
 Bright potential of the Human Body, by Magdalena Barile Tandhomas Sauerteig (2014) Role: Calda. Festival Grec
 Killing, Beating and Death in Agbanaspach, by Marcel Borràs and Nao Albet (2013)  Role: Maria Kapravof. TNC

Accolades

References

External links 
 
 
 

Spanish film actresses
Spanish television actresses
Living people
Actresses from Barcelona
Best Actress Goya Award winners
21st-century Spanish actresses
1985 births